The  is an airport rail link service connecting Sendai Airport to Sendai, Miyagi, Japan.  Rail service began on March 18, 2007.

Data
The third-sector Sendai Airport Transit Co., Ltd. (SAT) started construction of the line in 2002.  The construction cost is expected to reach 34.9 billion yen, and it may take as long as thirty years before the railway turns a profit.

Route: Natori Station – Sendai Airport Station
Length: 7.1 km
Gauge: 
Number of stations: 4, including terminals
Multiple-track sections: Single-track except for passing loop at Mitazono Station
Electrification: 20,000 V AC
Block system: Special automatic blocking (planned)
Rolling stock: JR E721-500 and SAT721 series 2-car EMUs

Station list

Rolling stock
SAT has ordered six 2-car SAT721 trainsets which are used in conjunction with similar design JR E721-500 series sets. The stainless-steel bodied trains feature barrier-free design and have a top speed of 120 km/h. LED indicators show the stations and destination. Train interior and exterior announcements are given in Japanese and English.

Connections
From Natori Station, service extends via the Tōhoku Main Line tracks to Sendai Station, a stop for the Tōhoku Shinkansen express trains located in central Sendai. From Sendai Station, it takes 17 minutes (rapid service) or 25 minutes (local service) to get to the airport. The railway also has advertised that Sendai Airport can be reached from neighboring cities such as Fukushima and Ichinoseki in under one hour.

Trains can be up to six cars in length. Besides being faster than existing bus services from the city, with a fare of 400 yen from Natori Station, or 650 yen from Sendai Station, the rail service is also less expensive.

Sendai Airport Transit

 is a third-sector company in charge of constructing and running the Sendai Airport Line train service between Sendai Airport Station and Natori Station in Miyagi Prefecture, Japan.

History
The company was founded on April 7, 2000, and  has capital of over seven billion yen. The Sendai Airport Line opened on March 18, 2007, electrified at 20 kV AC. The line was severely damaged by the 2011 Tōhoku earthquake and tsunami, and service was suspended indefinitely from March 11, 2011, and reopened on October 1 of that year.

Rolling stock 
The company owns three two-car SAT721 series EMU trains (identical in design to the JR East E721-500 series sets)

References

External links

Sendai Airport Transit website 
 
SAT from Sendai airport to Sendai Stn. (how-to movies on transportation in Sendai)
SAT from Sendai Stn. to Sendai airport (how-to movies on transportation in Sendai)

 
Railway lines in Japan
Rail transport in Miyagi Prefecture
Airport rail links in Japan
Railway lines opened in 2007
1067 mm gauge railways in Japan
Japanese third-sector railway lines
2007 establishments in Japan
Railway companies of Japan
Railway companies established in 2000